The National Soccer League 1981 season was the fifth season of the Australian National Soccer League (NSL). The league was known as the Philips Soccer League (PSL) in a sponsorship arrangement with Dutch electronics company Philips. The champions were Sydney Slickers, winning their third title.

Changes from 1980
The league increased from 14 to 16 teams prior to the 1981 season. Despite finishing second last—ordinarily a relegation position—in 1980, West Adelaide (known as Adelaide Hawks in 1981) were retained for 1981. Wooden-spooner St George were the only team to be relegated, with three new teams being introduced - Preston Makedonia (nicknamed Rams in 1981) Sydney Olympic (Sydney Olympians in 1981) and Wollongong City (Wollongong Wolves). 

Prior to the season commencing, in what was described as "Australianisation" of the national league, nicknames were imposed on the clubs, some of which were not popular with the teams themselves. Marconi President, Tony Labbozzetta expressed his dislike of the enforced nickname Leopards, suggesting "Call us Datsun", referring to a naming rights deal the club had made with the Japanese carmaker. Along with the new nicknames, new macho logos were introduced. John Clark, a marketing executive at the Australian Soccer Federation, claimed that "we are not trying to take ethnicism out of soccer" and that they were trying to appeal to boys "not following in their fathers' footsteps, boys now into space invaders, Buck Rogers in the 25th century, who aren't following soccer."

The league consisted of a double round-robin format, played between February and September. The league was required to finish by the end of September due to Australia's hosting of the 1981 FIFA World Youth Championship in October. Unlike the 1980 season, a post-season finals series was not held and the league championship was awarded to the team at the top of the table. The final series was reintroduced the following year.

Teams

League table

Results

Individual awards

Player of the Year: Bobby Russell (Adelaide Giants)
U-21 Player of the Year: David Mitchell (Adelaide Giants)
Top Scorer(s): Gary Cole (Heidelberg Warriors – 16 goals)
Coach of the Year: Eddie Thomson (Sydney Slickers)

Footnotes

References
OzFootball Archives - 1981 NSL Season

See also
1981 NSL Cup

National Soccer League (Australia) seasons
1
Aus